Swayambhu Purana or Svayambhū Purāṇa (Devanagari: स्वयम्भू पुराण) is a Buddhist scripture about the origin and development of Kathmandu valley. Swayambhu Purana gives details of all the Buddhas who came to Kathmandu. It also provides information about the first and the second Buddhas in Buddhism.

Date of writing and authorship

Description of Swayambhu Purana

First Chapter
Jina Shree Raj Bodhisattva had asked Jayaśrī about the origin of the Swayambhu; the description of the origin as told by Upagupta Bhikshu to king Ashoka has been narrated in the first chapter of the story of the origin of the Swayambhu.

It also gives an account of the prophecy made by Shree Shakyamuni to Maitreya Bodhisattva about the origin of the Swayambhu in the middle of the lotus with one thousand petals planted by Bipaswi Tathagata. At the time of Bipaswi, shree Shakyamuni was famous by the name of satyadharma Bodhisattva. In this chapter also shows the then Kathmandu valley was a big lake inhabited by Nagas (Snakes).

Second Chapter
In Second chapter, as a reply to the question of Maitreya Bodhisattva, "When did the Swayambhu come into being over the lotus planted by Bipaswi Tathagata?” Shakyamuni Bhagwan replied that Swayambhu originated at the time of Shikhi Tathagata when he was known as Kshemankar Bodhisattva. That chapter also gives a description of the fruits blessing due to worship of the Swayambhu.

Third Chapter
In the third chapter, Maitreya asks the Buddha, “When was the city made by clearing up the water of the lake in which by Nagas resided?" Thereupon Shayamuni Bhagwan replied, "When I was known as Parbataksha at the time of Biswabhu Tathagata, a person by the name of Manju Devacharya cleared up the water by destroying the forest of Kuruwa, Chabaha, Suryaghat and Gokarna and established a city, made Dharmakar its king and made the city famous as Manjupattan.

Fourth Chapter
Maitreya Bodhisattva asks Shakyamuni Bhagwan about the creation of the places of pilgrimage after the founding of the city of Nepal in the fourth chapter. Then after Shakyamuni Bhagwan explained, "Oh Maitreya! At the time when a human being had a life of forty thousand years, I was living as Jyotipal Bodhisattva in the city called Kshamavati at Krakuchhanda Tathagata’s  place, at the time when shree Krakuchhanda Bhagwan went to visit Shree Swayambhu. Then he narrated to his community and to the people in general about the origin of the holy pilgrimages to Bagamati and Keshawati.

Fifth Chapter
The fifth chapter provides:

 The story of Manilingeswor Manichud, the image of  Maitreya Bodhisattva on the hill of Manichud.
 The story of the salvation of the Prince Gokarna, Gokarneswor, the image of Gagangunj at Gokarna.
 The story of the suppression of Kulik, the king of the Nagas, Kileswor Vaitarag, the image of Samant Bhadra at Changu.
 The story of the salvation of Sarbapal Vaidya, Kumbheswor Vaitarag. The image of Vajrapani at Kwonti.
 The story of Manjugarta, who preferred sweets to learning, Garteswor, the image of Manjushree at the field of Phampi.
 The story of Omdiyan acharya, Phankeswor Vaitarag, the image of Sarbanibaran Viskambhi in the lake of Phampi.
 The story of the troubles faced by Omdiyan due to the testing of the god Ganesh.
 The story of Omdiyan visualizing the effect of Astasiddhi (mastery of eight Skills). Vikramayaswor Vaitaraga, the image of Khagarbha Bodhisattva at Adeswor.

Thus the fifth chapter recounts things about eight Vaitarag & the story of the salvation of Takshaka Naga at Punya Tirtha, a pilgrimage at Gokarna; the story of the salvation of Lord Shiva and his consort Parvati Gokarna; the story of the salvation of Lord Shiva and his consort Parvati at Shanta Tirtha, a pilgrimage at Guheswori, the story of the salvation of the shepherd Gopal by name at Shankar Tirtha, a pilgrimage at Shankhame; the story of the salvation of the gambler Din Chud at Nidhan Tirtha, a pilgrimage at Lakha Tirtha; the story of the salvation of the ignorant king called Sindhu at Gyan Tirtha, a pilgrimage at the Karha river; the story of the salvation of Koti Karna Sharthabaha, who showed impudence and disobeyed his own mother, at Chintamani Tirtha, a pilgrimage at Teku Dobhan, the story of the salvation of the demon Danasur at Danaga; the story of the salvation of the wicked king, the minister, and the sons of the merchant of the country of Gaud at Sulakshana Tirtha, a pilgrimage at Bhajanga, and the story of the salvation of the demon, the wife of Danasur, at Jaya Tirhta, a pilgrimage at Nekhu.

Sixth Chapter
The sixth Chapter incorporates accounts of the coming of Dharma Shree Mitra to Nepal to comprehend the meaning of the twelve alphabets mentioned in Namasangiti and the accounts of his being king of Nepal, and how Shree Swayambhu was made famous by the name of Dharma Dhatu Vagiswor.

Seventh Chapter
The seventh chapter gives an account of how the gods including Indra erected a stupa as a fulfillment of the wish of Shanty Karacharya to cover up Dharma Dhatu Vagiswor to make a bowl-shaped dipa over it, and also provides accounts of the establishment of the image of gods including Basapur, after invoking them.

Eighth Chapter
The eighth chapter describes the prophecy of lord Bhagwan as to how the Nepal Valley will face drought for seven years and how Gunakama Deve, as instructed by Shanti Karacharya, made the rain fall by bringing Karkotak, the king of Nagas.

Ninth Chapter
The ninth chapter comprises the prophecy of lord Bhagwan as to how the twelve-year-long drought would be put to an end, to Bandhu Datta, the pupil Shanti Karacharya, King Narendra Dev and Lalit, a farmer serving the king, by bringing lok Natha (the Lord of the world) from Kamaru Kamaksha; it also provides the name of twenty-one upa-Tirthas.

Tenth Chapter
In tenth chapter are the story about the Chuda Bikshuni and the highlights about the rules of telling and listening to the Swayambhu Puran, and also the blessing one gets for telling, telling, listening, making others listen, writing or making others write it.

See also
Pashupati Purana
Pragya Paramita

References

External links
Swayambhu Purana in scribd

Newar literature
Texts about the history of Buddhism
Maitreya